The University of Southern California School of Cinematic Arts (SCA) houses seven academic divisions: Film & Television Production; Cinema & Media Studies;  John C. Hench Division of Animation + Digital Arts; John Wells Division of Writing for Screen & Television; Interactive Media & Games; Media Arts + Practice; Peter Stark Producing Program.

The USC School of Cinematic Arts is led by dean Elizabeth Monk Daley, who holds the Steven J. Ross/Time Warner Chair and is the longest-serving dean at the University of Southern California, having led the cinema school since 1991.

History

When Douglas Fairbanks became the first president of the nascent Academy of Motion Picture Arts and Sciences in 1927, one of the more innovative items on his agenda was that the academy should have a “training school”. As Fairbanks and his enablers reasoned that training in the cinematic arts should be seen as a legitimate academic discipline at major universities, given the same degree considerations as fields like medicine and law. Although cinema studies programs are now widely entrenched in academia, back then it was a novel idea and many universities turned Fairbanks down. But he found tepid acceptance at the University of Southern California that agreed to allow one class, called “Introduction to Photoplay” that debuted in 1929, the same year as the Academy Awards. Determined to make it a success, Fairbanks brought in the biggest industry names of the era to lecture, including Douglas Fairbanks, Mary Pickford, D. W. Griffith, Charlie Chaplin, William C. DeMille, Ernst Lubitsch, Irving Thalberg, and Darryl Zanuck. From that one class grew a Department of Cinematography (1932) in the College of Letters, Arts and Sciences, renamed the Department of Cinema (1940), which led to the establishment of the USC School of Cinema-Television (1983), which was renamed the USC School of Cinematic Arts (2006).
.

On September 19, 2006, USC announced that alumnus George Lucas had donated US$175 million to expand the film school with a new  facility.  This represented the largest single donation to USC and the largest to any film school in the world. His previous donations resulted in the naming of two buildings in the school's previous complex, opened in 1984, after him and his then-wife Marcia, though Lucas was not fond of the Spanish Colonial Revival architecture used in those buildings.  An architectural hobbyist, Lucas laid out the original designs for the project, inspired by the Mediterranean Revival Style that was used in older campus buildings as well as the Los Angeles area.  The project also received another $50 million in contributions from Warner Bros., 20th Century Fox and The Walt Disney Company.

In fall 2006, the school, together with the Royal Film Commission of Jordan, created the Red Sea Institute of Cinematic Arts (RSICA) in Aqaba, Jordan. The first classes were held in 2008, and the first graduating class for the university was in 2010.

The USC School of Cinematic Arts announced it would remove an exhibit devoted to actor and former USC student John Wayne, after months of insistence from a small number of students denouncing the Hollywood star’s views and the portrayal of indigenous Americans in his films. The exhibit has been relocated to the Cinematic Arts library which has many collections for the study of figures whose lives and works are part of society's shared history.  These materials are preserved for posterity and made accessible for research and scholarship as will the materials in the Wayne Collection.

Divisions

Film & Television Production

The current Chair is Gail Katz, holder of the Mary Pickford Endowed Chair; Vice-Chair is Susan Arnold.

Cinema & Media Studies

The Division of Cinema & Media Studies is the central hub for film theory at the USC School of Cinematic Arts. The current Chair is Priya Jaikumar.

John C. Hench Division of Animation + Digital Arts

The John C. Hench Division of Animation + Digital Arts  teaches courses in animation and digital arts. These include classic character animation, 2-D and 3-D storytelling, performance capture, visual effects, motion graphics, stop-motion, experimental filmmaking, installations and multimedia, documentary animation, and visualizing scientific research. The current Chair is Teresa Cheng, who holds the John C. Hench Endowed Division Chair.

Interactive Media & Games Division

The Interactive Media & Games Division teaches video games, which make up the fastest growing segment of the entertainment industry. USC has been a pioneer in teaching the foundations of games and interactive media while also moving the field forward with innovative research concepts. The Princeton Review has ranked USC the #1 Game Design school in North America every year since its ranking system began in 2009. The current Chair is Danny Bilson.

Media Arts + Practice

The Media Arts + Practice Division (MA+P) creates and analyzes media for fields as diverse as business, medicine, education, architecture, law, urban planning, filmmaking. The current Chair is Holly Willis.

John Wells Division of Writing for Screen & Television

The USC School of Cinematic Arts offers Bachelor of Fine Arts and Master of Fine Arts degrees in Writing for Screen and Television for students who seek professional preparation for a career in screen and television writing. The programs emphasizes small, workshop-style classes. Students attend a variety of guest speaker presentations, take industry internships, are provided with mentors and are taught by professors who are actively working in the entertainment industry. Each fall, 30 undergraduate and 32 graduate writing students are selected to begin the program. The current Chair is David Isaacs.

Peter Stark Producing Program

The Peter Stark Producing Program is a two-year (four semester) full-time graduate program. Approximately 24 Peter Stark Program students are enrolled each fall. The curriculum is designed to prepare a select group of students for careers as producers and executives of film, television, and new media. The current Chair is Edward Saxon.

Faculty

The School of Cinematic Arts also has an active Board of Councilors who help guide the future direction of the School and work with the Dean to ensure the School is properly resourced.

Facilities
Donations from film and game industry companies, friends, and alumni have enabled the school to build the following facilities:

 School of Cinematic Arts Complex, completed in 2010, which includes:
 20th Century Fox soundstage
 George Lucas and Steven Spielberg Buildings, featuring the Ray Stark Family Theatre, which is equipped for 3D presentation, as well as two digital theatres, the Albert and Dana Broccoli Theatre and Fanny Brice Theatre
 Marcia Lucas Post-Production Center
 Marilyn & Jeffrey Katzenberg Center for Animation
 Sumner Redstone Production Building which contains two stages Redstone 1 and Redstone 2
 Interactive building (SCI), home of the USC Interactive Media & Games Division, the USC Division of Media Arts and Practice, and several research labs (the Game Innovation Lab, the Mobile and Environmental Media Lab, the Mixed Reality Lab and the Creative Media & Behavioral Health Center, among others)
 Robert Zemeckis Center for Digital Arts, home of Trojan Vision, USC's student television station
  Eileen Norris Cinema Theatre Complex, featuring a 365-seat theatre that also serves as a classroom with USC faculty member and Academy Award winner Tomlinson Holman's THX audiovisual reproduction standard used in film venues worldwide. The Frank Sinatra Hall, dedicated in 2002, houses a public exhibit and collection of extensive memorabilia commemorating Sinatra's life and contributions to American popular culture. 
 David L. Wolper Center at Doheny Memorial Library
 Louis B. Mayer Film and Television Study Center at Doheny Memorial Library 
 Hugh M. Hefner Moving Image Archive

At the center of the new television complex is a statue of founder Douglas Fairbanks. He is seen holding a fencing foil in one hand and a script in the other to reflect his strong ties with the USC Fencing Club.

Distinctions
[[File:052707-022-NorrisCinema-USC.jpg|thumb|200px|The Eileen Norris Cinema Theater, a 340-seat theater that regularly hosts film screenings, lectures, and special events.<ref>Eileen Norris Cinema Theatre Complex, USC School of Cinematic Arts Facilities, Accessed January 3, 2009.</ref>  It was where THX was first developed and installed.]]
 Since 1973, at least one alumnus of SCA has been nominated for an Academy Award annually, totaling 256 nominations and 78 wins.
 Since 1973, at least one SCA alumnus or alumna has been nominated for the Emmy Award annually, totaling 473 nominations and 119 wins.
 The top 17 grossing films of all time have had an SCA graduate in a key creative position.
 The Princeton Review has ranked the Interactive Media and Games Division's video game design program best in North America multiple years in a row.
 Both The Hollywood Reporter and USA Today have ranked SCA the number one film program in the world, with its unmatched facilities, proximity to Hollywood, and numerous industry connections being the primary rationale.
 The current acceptance rate for the USC School of Cinematic Arts is 3%.

Awards for USC Cinema short films
 In 1956, producer Wilber T. Blume, a USC Cinema instructor at the time, received an Academy Award for best live action short film for a film he created entitled The Face of Lincoln. Blume also received an Academy Award nomination that year for documentary short.
 In 1968, George Lucas won first prize in the category of Dramatic films at the third National Student Film Festival held at Lincoln Center, New York for his futuristic Electronic Labyrinth: THX 1138 4EB.Rinzler, J.W., The Complete Making of Indiana Jones; The Definitive Story Behind All Four Films, Del Rey, 2008, .
 In 1970, producer John Longenecker received an Academy Award for best live action short film for a film he produced while attending USC Cinema 480 classes as an undergraduate—The Resurrection of Broncho Billy. The film's crew and cast included Nick Castle, cinematographer; John Carpenter, film editor and original music; James Rokos, director; Johnny Crawford, lead actor; and Kristin Nelson, lead actress.
 In 1973, Robert Zemeckis won a Special Jury Award at the Academy of Motion Picture Arts & Sciences' second annual Student Film Awards presentation for A Field of Honor.
 In 2001, MFA student David Greenspan won the Palme d’Or for short film at the Cannes Film Festival for his student film Bean Cake.
 In 2006, director, co-writer, and producer Ari Sandel received an Academy Award for best live action short film ("West Bank Story") made as a USC Cinema graduate school project.
 In 2009, MFA student Gregg Helvey was nominated for an Academy Award for his MFA thesis film, Kavi.
 In 2020, School of Cinematic Arts graduate Travis Misenti directed a science fiction film, The Echo Worlds, that was awarded the January Nominee (for the movie trailer category) of the year of 2020 for The Monthly Film Festival.

 Awards for USC Cinema feature films 

 In 2019, the crime / thriller film Samir became an official selection for the 2019 Heartland International Film Festival with the help of Warner Bros. Entertainment.

Notable SCA alumniSee also List of University of Southern California people''

SCA has more than 12,000 alumni. Among the most notable are:

 Sasha Alexander
 Ante Cheng
 Scott Alexander
 Elizabeth Allen
 Thom Andersen
 Judd Apatow
 Gregg Araki
 Aditya Assarat
 Doug Atchison
 John August
 John Bailey
 Kelley Baker
 Richard L. Bare
 Hal Barwood
 Walt Becker
 Jim Bernstein
 David Bezmozgis
 Laura Bialis
 Gregg Bishop
 Paul Harris Boardman
 Dominic Arizona Bonuccelli
 A. C. Bradley
 Charles Braverman
 Mehcad Brooks
 Norman Buckley
 Bryan Burk
 Ben Burtt
 Trey Callaway
 Steven Cantor
 John Carpenter
 Nick Castle
 Aneesh Chaganty
 Sharon Choi
 Adam Christian Clark
 Jon Chu
 Art Clokey
 Ryan Coogler
 Ericson Core
 Jack Couffer
 R. J. Cutler
 Mark Z. Danielewski
 Thomas Del Ruth
 Scott Derrickson
 Caleb Deschanel
 Trygve Allister Diesen
 Craig Detweiler
 Susan Downey
 Daniel Dubiecki
 Richard Edlund
 Lindsay Ellis
 Kevin Feige
 Bobby Florsheim
 Frank E. Flowers
 Tyler Fredrickson
 David Gallagher
 Bob Gale
 Gavin Garrison
 Douglas Gayeton
 Scott Gimple
 Alfred Gough
 David S. Goyer
 James Gray
 Macy Gray
 Brian Grazer
 Luke Greenfield
 Kevin Greutert
 Ashley Greyson
 Javier Grillo-Marxuach
 Lawrence Guterman
 Conrad Hall
 Jane Hamsher
 Ray Harryhausen
 Grant Heslov
 Matthew Ryan Hoge
 Sean Hood
 Ron Howard
 Martin Hynes
 James Ivory
 O'Shea Jackson Jr.
 Joe Johnston
 Rian Johnson
 Larry Karaszewski
 Ke Huy Quan
 Richard Kelly
 Nahnatchka Khan
 Karey Kirkpatrick
 Randal Kleiser
 Tim Kring
 Eric Kripke
 Kurt Kuenne
 Ken Kwapis
 Brandon Laatsch
 Jon Landau
 Alexander Sebastien Lee
 Chris Chan Lee
 Shawn Levy
 R. Eric Lieb
 Doug Liman
 John Longenecker
 George Lucas
 Albert Magnoli
 Gregory Markopoulos
 Richard Martini
 Joseph Mazzello
 John Milius
 Miles Millar
 F. Hudson Miller
 John Lloyd Miller
 Derek Mio
 Stephen Mirrione
 Raamla Mohamed
 Walter Murch
 Don Murphy
 Tab Murphy
 Tom Neff
 Laura Neri
 Eric Newman
Doug Nichol
 Dan O'Bannon
 Tracy Oliver 
 Randy Olson
 Tom Oesch
 Richard Outten
 Chris Parson
 Paula Patton
 Sam Peckinpah (drama major)
 Charlie Pecoraro
 Michael R. Perry
 Brian Wayne Peterson
 Shawn Piller
 Stu Pollard
 Dan Povenmire
 Santiago Pozo
 Ben Proudfoot
 Ben Queen
 Kevin Reynolds
 Ben Ripley
 Shonda Rhimes
 Jay Roach
 Steven Robiner
 Barry Rubinow
 Jason Russell
 Gary Rydstrom
 Walter Salles
 Edward Saxon
 Josh Schwartz
 Ben Shedd
 Stacey Sher
 Robert Sherman
 Christine Shin
 Sofia Shinas
 Sigurjón Sighvatsson
 John Singleton
 Bryan Singer
 Stephen Sommers
 Dror Soref
 Guido Mina di Sospiro
 Kevin Stea
 Adam Stein
 David H. Steinberg
 Tim Story
 Joy Sunday
 Chris Terrio
 Jon Turteltaub
 Ron Underwood
 Lee Unkrich
 Christopher Vogler
 Matthew Weiner
 John Wells
 Alexander Winn
 Freddie Wong
 Marianna Yarovskaya
 Robert Yeoman
 Rayka Zehtabchi
 Robert Zemeckis
 Laura Ziskin
 Bradley Steven Perry

Other notable faculty members and instructors (past and present) 

 Danny Bilson
 Mitchell Block
 Mark Bolas
 Peter Bonerz
 Todd Boyd
 Trey Callaway
 Drew Casper
 Peter Chung
 Frank Daniel
 Edward Dmytryk
 Duwayne Dunham
 John A. Ferraro
 Verna Fields
 Scott Fisher
 Rachel Feldman
James Franco

 Robert L. Freedman
 Anne Friedberg
 Nina Foch
 Tracy Fullerton
 Maureen Furniss
 Eric Goldberg
 Dan Gordon
 Mark Jonathan Harris
 Ray Harryhausen
 Tomlinson Holman
 Gordy Hoffman
 Sean Hood
 Jerry Lewis
 Leonard Maltin

 Robert McKee
 Michael Naimark
 Christine Panushka
 Mark Pesce
 Gene Polito
 Abraham Polonsky
 Bill Prady
 Howard Rodman
 Howard Rosenberg
 Tom Sito
 Kathy Smith
 Chris Swain
 Larry Turman
 Jordan Weisman
 Paul Wolff
 Slavko Vorkapić

See also
 Glossary of motion picture terms
 The Dirty Dozen (filmmaking), a group of students in the 1960s

References

School of Cinematic Arts
Film schools in California
Animation schools in the United States
Educational institutions established in 1929
1929 establishments in California